Facundo Taborda (born 8 June 1995) is an Argentine professional footballer who plays as a midfielder for Flandria.

Career
Boca Juniors signed Taborda from Atlético Rivadavia, after he had spells with Barrio Norte and Independiente de América. He was loaned out by Boca Juniors in 2016, joining Primera B Nacional's Juventud Unida Universitario. He made his pro debut on 6 February 2016 against Independiente Rivadavia, which was the first of six appearances for them. A year later, Uruguayan Segunda División side Cerro Largo loaned Taborda. Taborda joined Defensa y Justicia of the Argentine Primera División on loan in August 2017, though left in August 2018 to Ascenso MX club Zacatepec.

His first appearance in Mexican football arrived on 19 October 2018 versus Potros UAEM. After one goal, against Correcaminos UAT, in twenty-five total matches for Zacatepec, Taborda left in mid-2020 to return to Uruguay with Atenas. He scored goals against Villa Española, Albion and Villa Teresa during a run of sixteen appearances up until the end of November. With the 2020 season over, Taborda went on to depart and sign with homeland team Atlanta on 25 February 2021. On 28 January 2022, Taborda moved to Flandria.

Career statistics
.

References

External links

1995 births
Living people
Sportspeople from Buenos Aires Province
Argentine footballers
Association football midfielders
Argentine expatriate footballers
Expatriate footballers in Uruguay
Expatriate footballers in Mexico
Argentine expatriate sportspeople in Uruguay
Argentine expatriate sportspeople in Mexico
Primera Nacional players
Ascenso MX players
Uruguayan Segunda División players
Boca Juniors footballers
Juventud Unida Universitario players
Cerro Largo F.C. players
Defensa y Justicia footballers
Club Atlético Zacatepec players
Atenas de San Carlos players
Club Atlético Atlanta footballers
Flandria footballers